Mount Mackintosh is an Antarctic mountain, at , and is the northernmost peak in the Prince Albert Mountains range, within the Transantarctic Mountains. The range was discovered in 1841 by James Clark Ross and was extensively explored during the Heroic Age of Antarctic Exploration. Mount Mackintosh, which rises to 8,097 feet (2468 m.).

Charted by the British Antarctic Expedition (Nimrod Expedition) (1907–09) under Shackleton, was named by Shackleton after Aeneas Mackintosh, the Scottish-born Second Officer on the expedition ship - the Nimrod, and later leader of the Ross Sea party during Shackleton's Imperial Trans-Antarctic Expedition, 1914–17. Mackintosh disappeared on 8 May 1916 while walking on the ice in McMurdo Sound, between Hut Point and Cape Evans.

Notes and references

Sources
Bickel, Lennard: Shackleton's Forgotten Men Pimlico, London 2001 
Britannica on-line at :Article on Prince Albert Mountains, accessed 18 April 2008
New Zealand Heritage at : Mackintosh biographical details, accessed 18 April 2008

Prince Albert Mountains
Mountains of Victoria Land
Scott Coast